Halsey Lawrence Royden, Jr. (September 26, 1928 – August 22, 1993) was an American mathematician, specializing in complex analysis on Riemann surfaces, several complex variables, and complex differential geometry. Royden is the author of a popular textbook on real analysis.

Education and career 
After study at Phoenix College, Royden transferred in 1946 to Stanford University, where he received his bachelor's degree in 1948 and his master's degree in 1949, with a master's thesis written under the supervision of Donald Spencer. Royden received his Ph.D. in 1951 at Harvard University under the supervision of Lars Ahlfors with thesis Harmonic functions on open Riemann surfaces. At Stanford University he became an assistant professor in 1951, an associate professor in 1953, and a full professor in 1958. In addition to serving on the faculty of the mathematics department, for Stanford's School of Humanities and Sciences he was in 1962–1965 associate dean, in 1968–1969 executive dean (acting dean until the vacancy was resolved), and in 1973–1981 dean. In 1981 he resigned as dean to work full-time as a mathematics professor. He was on the editorial board of the Pacific Journal of Mathematics for the five years from 1956 to 1960. Royden was a visiting scholar at the Institute for Advanced Study in Princeton for 3 months in the fall of 1969, 3 months in the spring of 1974, and for the academic year 1982–1983.

In 1970, he showed the equivalence of the Kobayashi metric and the Teichmüller metric on Teichmüller space.<ref>{{cite journal|author=Royden, H. L.|title=Report on the Teichmüller Metric|journal=Proc Natl Acad Sci USA|volume=65|issue=3|date=March 1970|pages=497–499|pmc=282934|doi=10.1073/pnas.65.3.497|pmid=16591819|bibcode=1970PNAS...65..497R|doi-access=free}}</ref>

Royden was a Guggenheim Fellow for the academic year 1973–1974. In 1974 he was an Invited Speaker (Intrinsic metrics on Teichmüller space) at the International Mathematical Congress in Vancouver.

Upon his death he was survived by his wife (the mathematician Virginia "Jinx" Voegeli), two daughters (one, Leigh Royden, a noted geologist), a son, and several grandchildren. His doctoral students include Alan Huckleberry, Peter A. Loeb and John Wetzel.

Selected publications
Books
   
Papers

with P. R. Garabedian: 

A History of Mathematics at Stanford in A century of mathematics in America'', American Mathematical Society, 1989, vol. 2.

References

1928 births
1993 deaths
20th-century American mathematicians
Stanford University alumni
Harvard University alumni
Stanford University faculty
Institute for Advanced Study visiting scholars
People from Phoenix, Arizona
Phoenix College alumni
Complex analysts
Mathematical analysts
Textbook writers
Differential geometers